Joseph Tanner may refer to:

 Joseph M. Tanner (1859–1927), American educator and missionary and leader in The Church of Jesus Christ of Latter-day Saints
 Joseph R. Tanner (born 1950), American aviator and astronaut
 Joseph Robson Tanner (1860–1931), English historian